Kfardebian (also spelled Kfar Dibiane and also known as Moucha'a Keserwan) is a municipality in the Keserwan District of the  Keserwan-Jbeil Governorate in Lebanon. It is located 45 kilometers north of Beirut. Its average elevation is 1,220 meters above sea level and its total land area is 2,960 hectares. Kfardebian inhabitants are predominantly Melkite and Maronite Christians.

Kfardebian gathers the oldest and largest skiing resorts in Lebanon and the Middle East, such as Mzaar Kfardebian and Faqra Kfardebian, as well as many historical and touristic sites, such as Qalaat Faqra.

Etymology
Kfardebian consists of two parts: Kfar which is Syriac word means small village, and Debian is another Syriac word, which literally means deers, thus Kfardebian means village of deers.

History
In 1838, Eli Smith noted  Kefr Dhibyan as a village located in "Aklim el-Kesrawan, Northeast of Beirut; the chief seat of the Maronites".

See also
Qalaat Faqra

References

Bibliography

External links
Kfar Dibiane, localiban

Populated places in Keserwan District
Maronite Christian communities in Lebanon
Melkite Christian communities in Lebanon